Saint John High School is a high school located in Saint John, New Brunswick, Canada. It was founded in 1805 and is the oldest publicly funded school in Canada.

History
On March 5, 1805, the New Brunswick Legislature passed, "An Act for encouraging and extending literature in the province." The passage of this act led to the creation of The Saint John Grammar School to meet the needs of a "... proper and adequate educational institute" (SJHS) for boys. On March 19, 1805 Common Council granted £100 towards the creation of a school building on Germain St. on land purchased from Mr. Thomas Horsfield. In 1819, Dr. Patterson started his fifty-one year reign as principal of the Grammar School.

"The Commons Schools Act" of 1871 led to the Grammar School coming under the supervision of the School Board and the creation of the Girls' High School. By 1874 the closing exercises of the Grammar School and the Girls' High School were a joint venture.

Victoria Girls School 
In 1876 the Victoria Building was opened as the girls' high school. Unfortunately, a year later the Great Fire destroyed both this new school and the "... ancient looking wooden building on the corner of Germain and Horsfield" (St. John High). A new Victoria School for girls was opened in 1878 but the Grammar School was located in a variety of buildings until a new high school building was erected on Union Street for both boys and girls. It opened as Saint John High School in 1897. Even though the students were housed in the same building, segregation of the sexes was an entrenched idea. Few students experienced academic instruction from members of the opposite sex. A few activities however, such as the school orchestra created in Saint John High School on Union Street 1898, were co-educational. This building served the students of SJHS until the 1930s when academic demands and curricular innovations necessitated the building of a new school.

The school's current facility, designed by the architect Herbert Stanley Brenan, opened in 1932 with over 1100 students. Segregation of the sexes continued as a tradition, with the boys using the Duke Street entrance and the girls the Canterbury Street one. It was not until Dr. A. T. G. Harrison's tenure that classes became co-ed.

Two additions have been made to this building since its opening. The "New Wing" added in 1964 houses the science labs, a double gymnasium and a swimming pool. In 1986 the school underwent major renovations updating its electrical needs, outfitting it with new windows, creating new computer labs and adding an enlarged modern library.

Mr. Barry Harbinson, who retired as principal in June 2008, has included in the School Improvement Plan further requirements for the building. He has articulated the need for a fourth floor on the New Wing to house technology labs, thus freeing up desperately needed classroom space in the old building.

Throughout its two-hundred-year-old history, numerous traditions have been established. The school colours, originally brown and blue, were changed to red and grey in 1903, and the school motto, "Vita Vitalis - A Life Worth While" was adopted in 1932. However, the school dress for graduation (ladies in white and gentlemen in suits) is as old as the school itself. The Alumni Association also has a long legacy since its establishment in 1897. One of their most noticeable ties with the past is their collection of class photographs dating back to 1896. Playing "find the ancestor" is a sport for many students, parents and visitors.

International Baccalaureate
In 1983, Dr. Jack Wagstaff, Mr. Richard Thorne and Mrs. Sandi Thorne initiated the research that led Saint John High to become the first accredited International Baccalaureate school in New Brunswick. Since its inception, Saint John High has witnessed a number of students fulfill the demanding schedule of the Diploma Programme or complete the internal and external assessment of the IB courses. Saint John High is the only public school in New Brunswick to currently offer students these courses.

Hounds football
Saint John High school's football team, coached by David Grandy, made it to the 2008 NBIAA high school football championship game after defeating Riverview Royals 21-8. It was the first time since 1981 for the Hounds. The Hounds lost the provincial game against the Bernice MacNaughton Highlanders. From 2011-2012 the team was dominated by running back Freddy "Hurricane" Hammond.

Notable alumni
 David Russell Jack, 1881
Walter Harley Trueman (1870-1951), justice, Manitoba Court of Appeal
 Eldon Rathburn (1916-2008) the most prolific film composer in the history of the National Film Board of Canada (over 250 film scores)
 Richard Currie (1937-), Chancellor of the University of New Brunswick
 Steve Murphy (1960-), broadcaster
 Brent Bambury (1960-),

References

External links
 Saint John High School

High schools in Saint John, New Brunswick
International Baccalaureate schools in New Brunswick
Educational institutions established in 1805
1805 establishments in the British Empire